Mirobod is one of 12 districts (tuman) of Tashkent, the capital of Uzbekistan.

Overview
It is one of the central districts of the city and was established in 1981 with the name of Lenin, referring to the famous Russian communist leader Vladimir Lenin.

Mirobod borders with the districts of Sergeli, Yakkasaray, Yunusabad, Hamza and Bektemir.

References

External links

Districts of Tashkent
Populated places established in 1981
1981 establishments in the Soviet Union